Ciro De Cesare (Salerno, 16 December 1971) is an Italian footballer.
He was a striker who played for numerous teams in Serie A, Serie B and Serie C.

Career
In 1997 De Cesare was hired by Salerno, his hometown team.

De Cesare played for the A.C. ChievoVerona side that achieved historic promotion to Serie A in 2001, scoring eight goals in 35 Serie B appearances. He began the 2001–02 Serie A season with Chievo, making three appearances, before going out on loan to Siena Calcio and A.S.D. Spezia Calcio 2008.

References

External links
Profile at Lega-Calcio.it

1971 births
Living people
Italian footballers
S.S. Turris Calcio players
A.C. ChievoVerona players
Como 1907 players
Frosinone Calcio players
Piacenza Calcio 1919 players
A.C.N. Siena 1904 players
U.S. Salernitana 1919 players
Cavese 1919 players
Spezia Calcio players
Serie A players
Serie B players
Association football forwards